St Paul's School is a selective private day school (with limited boarding) for boys aged 13–18, founded in 1509 by John Colet and located on a 43-acre site by the Thames in London.

St Paul's was one of nine English public schools investigated by the Clarendon Commission, which subsequently became known as the Clarendon schools. However, the school successfully argued that it was a private school and consequently was omitted from the Public Schools Act 1868, as was Merchant Taylors', the other day school within the scope of Lord Clarendon's terms of reference. Since 1881, St Paul's has had its own preparatory school, St Paul's Juniors (formerly Colet Court), which since 1968 has been located on the same site.

St Paul's has been ranked the leading boys' school in the country academically, maintaining high average GCSE and A-Level results, and one of the highest Oxbridge acceptance rates of any secondary school or college.

The school is currently being rebuilt and expanded as part of an extensive project beginning in 2011, and set to last thirty years.

History
St Paul's School takes its name from St Paul's Cathedral in London. A cathedral school had existed since around 1103. By the 16th century however, it had declined, and in 1509, a new school was founded by John Colet, Dean of St Paul's Cathedral, on a plot of land to the north of the Cathedral.

The eldest son of Sir Henry Colet (a member of the Mercers' Company and twice Lord Mayor of the City of London), John Colet inherited a substantial fortune and used a great part of it for the endowment of his school, having no family of his own; his 21 brothers and sisters all died in childhood and he was a celibate priest. He described himself in the statutes of the school as "desyring nothing more thanne Educacion and bringing upp chyldren in good Maners and litterature."

Originally, the school provided education for 153 children of "all nacions and countries indifferently", primarily in literature and etiquette. The number 153 has long been associated with the miraculous draught of fishes recorded in St John's Gospel, and for several generations Foundation Scholars have been given the option of wearing an emblem of a silver fish. St Paul's was the largest school in England at its foundation, and its High Master had a salary of 13 shillings and sixpence weekly, which was double that of the contemporary Head Master of Eton College. The scholars were not required to make any payment, although they were required to be literate and had to pay for their own wax candles, which at that time were an expensive commodity.

Colet was an outspoken critic of the powerful and worldly Church of his day, and a friend of both Erasmus and Sir Thomas More. Erasmus wrote textbooks for the school and St Paul's was the first English school to teach Greek, reflecting the humanist interests of the founder. Colet distrusted the Church as a managing body for his school, declaring that he "found the least corruption" in married laymen. For this reason, Colet assigned the management of the School and its revenues to the Mercers' Company, the premier livery company in the City of London, with which his father had been associated. In 1876 the company was legally established as trustee of the Colet estate, and the management of the school was assigned to a Board of Governors consisting of the Master, Wardens and nine members of the company, together with three representatives from each of the Universities of Oxford, Cambridge and London. The Mercers' Company still forms the major part of the School's governing body, and it continues to administer Colet's trust.

One of St Paul's early headmasters was Richard Mulcaster, famous for writing two influential treatises on education (Positions, in 1581, and Elementarie in 1582). His description in Positions of "footeball" as a refereed team sport is the earliest reference to organised modern football. For this description and his enthusiasm for the sport he is considered the father of modern football.

Between 1861 and 1864, the Clarendon Commission (a Royal Commission) investigated the public school system in England and its report formed the basis of the Public Schools Act 1868. St Paul's was one of only nine schools considered by the Clarendon Commission, and one of only two schools which was not predominantly attended by boarders (the other day school was Merchant Taylors').

According to Charles Dickens Jr., writing in 1879

By comparison, in 2016 the Daily Telegraph reported that families earning up to £120,000 were being offered bursaries after the headmaster declared that the school had become "unaffordable".

Between 1886 and 1895, St Paul's boys won 173 entrance awards at Oxford and Cambridge, which was 26 more than any other school. Over many years its record of Open Awards at Oxford and Cambridge in all subjects has been equal, or superior, to that of any other school of comparable size.

School coat of arms
Like many ancient educational foundations, St Paul's School traditionally used the arms of its founder, John Colet. His arms were Sable on a chevron Argent between three Hinds trippant Argent three Annulets Sable, and they were originally used by his great-grandfather, Richard Colet. As Dean of St Paul's, he was entitled to impale them with the arms of the Deanery, and the school has often used them in this form also. In 2002, the school obtained its own grant of arms from the College of Arms consisting of the arms of Dean Colet surrounded by a gold bordure, upon which the crossed swords of the Dean of St Paul's are repeated.

Apposition
Apposition is a traditional ceremony at St Paul's and was originally a way of allowing the Mercers’ Company to assess teaching staff and the High Master, with the option of dismissing or reappointing them. The assessment takes the form of a third-party "apposer", often a leading academic, judging the quality of teaching through scrutinising lectures given by boys in their final year. Today it is primarily a prize giving event, where prizes are awarded to senior boys who have excelled in particular subjects. The Apposition Dinner is held in the Mercer's Hall in London every year around May.

Consequences of apposition have led to the dismissal of previous High Masters including Thomas Freeman, for lack of learning (although more probably for holding the incorrect religious views) in 1559. In 1748, High Master Charles was removed as he had allegedly threatened to "pull the Surmaster by the nose and kick him about the school."

Since it was re-introduced in 1969, the ceremony today takes place in May and is purely ceremonial, incorporating prize giving for boys in the final two years of the school.

Buildings

City of London

The original school, which stood in St Paul's Churchyard, was destroyed with the Cathedral in the Great Fire of London in 1666. The school was twice rebuilt, first in 1670, and again on the same site in 1822; but towards the end of the 19th century, as London expanded and residents moved away from the City of London and its environs, it was decided that the school should move to larger premises.

Hammersmith

In 1884 a new building designed by the architect Alfred Waterhouse rose to dominate the countryside of Hammersmith. The terracotta for the Hammersmith school was made by the famous Gibbs and Canning of Tamworth. At this time the street numbering was changed locally and so the school address, whether by accident or design, became 153 Hammersmith Road. The preparatory school, Colet Court, was soon afterwards housed in new premises in a similar style on the opposite side of the road.

In September 1939 the school was evacuated to Easthampstead Park, near Crowthorne in Berkshire, where, under the then High Master, W. F. Oakeshott, it became solely a boarding school for the period of the war. Playing fields and some other facilities were borrowed from nearby Wellington College, but the boys and the teachers from the two schools remained entirely separate.

In the meantime, the London buildings became the headquarters of the Home Forces in July 1940 and the headquarters of the XXI Army Group under the command of General, later Field-Marshal, Bernard Montgomery, himself an Old Pauline, in July 1943. There the XXI army part of the military side of the invasion of Europe was planned, including the D-Day landings. The map that he used is still present in the modern day site of the school in the Montgomery Room. The school recovered its buildings in September 1945, and resumed life essentially as a day school, although it retains a small number of boarders to this day. In 1959, Queen Elizabeth II visited the school to mark the 450th anniversary of its founding. Upon her death, BBC journalist John Simpson, a pupil at the time, was most complimentary, saying that "we were all just bowled over by it [the visit]".

Following the school's move to Barnes in 1968, the Hammersmith buildings were demolished – amid protests – to allow building of flats, apart from the gates and the peripheral walls, the High Master's House, and a toolhut. The Colet Court building also survives.

Barnes

By 1961 it had become evident that the old school buildings were unsuited to modern educational needs. The opportunity arose to rebuild the school on a 45-acre (182,000 m²) riverside site at Barnes, adjacent to Hammersmith Bridge. This land had previously been the site of reservoirs which were filled in with earth excavated during the construction of the Victoria line. The sports pitches took a long time to settle, and competitive matches were not played regularly at the Barnes site until summer 1979.

The fifth school buildings were opened in September 1968, to designs by architects Feilden and Mawson. The new site also includes the preparatory school, St Paul's Juniors (formerly Colet Court), whose pupils account for roughly one half of the senior school's intake each year.

The 1968 buildings include a 25m, 6 lane swimming pool shared with St Paul's Juniors. Extensive sports facilities notably include a fencing salle, six rugby fives courts, three squash courts and a racquets court. The location next to the River Thames meant that a rowing boathouse was included in the plans, which itself included both an indoor training tank and housing to accommodate a boatman, whose primary job was to build and maintain the boats. A striking and deliberate omission from the new buildings was any provision for a school hall capable of holding all masters and boys simultaneously, and although the main sports hall is large enough to accommodate the entire school, the difficulty in setting up enough chairs means that the hall is used to house the entire school only twice per year. There were originally two boarding houses in the 1968 buildings (School House and High House) accommodating up to 120 boarders, but the number of boarders has steadily declined since then and is now only 20. One of the boarding houses (School House) has been demolished to make way for a new music building, which houses the Wathen Hall. The other (High House, renamed School House) is in the process of being demolished, with boarders relocated to the recently renovated Colet House. The only building which remained from the previous Water Board landowners became the music department for St Paul's Juniors.

The original buildings were built using a modular system of interlocking concrete slabs, known as the CLASP system. This allowed for relatively quick and cheap construction, and allowed for the fact that much of the site was formed from reservoir land which was still settling. The whole complex is now in need of replacement; the only existing buildings likely to remain are the Music school, incorporating the Wathen Hall from 1999 and the Rackets Court.

2009–present day
The boys' school numbered 856 boys in 2009, the 500th year of its foundation. A rebuilding of the school at its present site is planned, to be completed over a 25-year period.  While former High Master, George Martin Stephen, announced an aspiration for the school to be needs-blind within 25 years, £250 million will need to be raised to accomplish this.

The school day lasts from 8.35 a.m. to 4.15 p.m. and consists of 8 periods, including a one-and-three-quarter-hour lunch break during which pupils are encouraged to participate in sporting or extracurricular activities such as music, debating or computing. Pupils of all ages are not allowed to leave the school premises without permission at any time during the day.

The school still maintains a boarding house. There are strong boarding house traditions including the annual bonfire and two hours of compulsory study known as "prep" every evening. Newer traditions include the sponsored all night five-a-side football tournament, a "charity sponging" event. However, the charity sponging did not take place in 2010 due to, as some boarders claim, complaints from a boarding student who had been "sponged" particularly often and the future of the traditional event is unclear.

The school has recently opened its Science wing. The wing is a four-storey building finished in February 2013, built to give university standard of work spaces and labs. The school now has its own scanning electron microscope along with the new science building. It has a floor dedicated to each branch of science, i.e. biology, physics and chemistry. The bottom floor is a careers and university section to for the older students. Tables with computers and spaces for students or staff to use as desks are available on all floors.

A large number of music concerts, art exhibitions and plays take place each year, and pupils regularly receive national recognition for their achievements. The school also has a strong sports department; St Paul's was a founding member of the Rugby Football Union in 1871 and was pre-eminent in public school boxing, its first team failing to win only two boxing matches against first team boxers from other schools over a period of 25 years; however, boxing was discontinued as a school sport in the 1960s. More recently, the school teams were runners-up in the rugby U15 Daily Mail Cup in 2005 and in 2007. The school has a strong record in rugby. In 1979, the 1st XV of St Paul's, nicknamed the 'Invincibles' went twelve matches undefeated. Big rivals for the school are RGS Guildford, King's College School, Dulwich College, St John's Leatherhead, Merchant Taylors', Wellington and Eton.

Staff pay 
St Paul's ranks highest on the Sunday Times Private School Pay List, with nine staff members paid salaries exceeding £100,000 in the accounting period 2019-20. St Paul’s also had the highest individual earner, with one staff member earning between £330,000 and £339,000 from September 2019 to August 2020.

Operation Winthorpe
St Paul's has been investigated by the Metropolitan Police for historic crimes of paedophilia so serious the investigation was given its own operational name, Operation Winthorpe. Since then school has reviewed and revised its safeguarding procedures.
A major independent report published in January 2020, revealed 80 complaints against 32 members of staff over a period of six decades, mainly from the 1960s to the 1990s. There were 28 recommendations on how current practice could be improved.

Sports facilities
The school has numerous sports facilities, and sport plays a major part in the everyday lives of the boys. There is a large sports hall, gymnasium, dojo, fencing salle, 25m swimming pool, 6 fives courts, a rackets court, three squash courts, a fitness centre, a 100m sprint straight, ten tennis courts and a multi use games area (MUGA). There is also a large boathouse and the school has extensive playing fields which consist of 11 football or rugby pitches during the winter months, including a recently built '3g' pitch, or seven cricket pitches during the summer months.

Renewal campaign

The renewal campaign is the project to rebuild the entire school campus, frequently known as the Masterplan.

The majority of the current buildings date from the 1960s, and the CLASP technology used in the construction of the buildings has a limited lifespan. Even though over the last few years various buildings (such as the Wathen Hall Music School, Rackets Court and Milton Building) have been added on the campus wherever space was available, the dated buildings represent approximately three quarters of the school.

Local planning restrictions combined with a lack of available surplus land mean that St Paul's is faced with progressively replacing obsolete buildings with new ones located in the same general area. The plan should eventually result in a large building footprint area increase as well as increasing the amount of staff housing. The number of car parking spaces will be reduced, but there will be much more available room for bicycles.

In 2007, Nicholas Hare Architects were appointed to produce detailed designs for the first set of new buildings. Late in 2009, Richmond Council granted St Paul's detailed planning permission, and building started in 2011
The new science block and courtyard building was completed in 2012 and won a Civic Trust Award in 2013 and a RIBA London Award in 2015. Two years later, the new Drama Centre and Samuel Pepys Theatre was completed. This building was also designed by Nicholas Hare Architects.

Walters & Cohen Architects were appointed to design a new teaching building for the school in 2012. The building, which is arranged in an L-shape in order to connect to buildings on either side on all levels, and enclose the central green courtyard known as Founder’s Court, was completed in 2019. At more than 9,000m², it comprises classrooms, the Kayton Library – named after Desmond Kayton, an Old Pauline who fought in World War II – as well as a dining hall, kitchen, administrative offices, a chapel, hall and social spaces, including a generous multi-purpose Atrium. Elegant vertical piers set out an irregular rhythm and form an integral part of the building's energy efficiency, providing natural ventilation, solar shading and noise attenuation.

Sporting Successes

Rugby
In 2007, St Paul's recorded their most notable result in the sport when they reached the final of the U15 Daily Mail Cup, the premier rugby union tournament for British secondary schools. The team was coached by Richard Girvan, Surmaster from 2012 to 2020. St Paul's lost the game played at Twickenham Stadium 20-15 to Lymm High School.

Rowing
The St Paul's School Boat Club (SPSBC) has won the Princess Elizabeth Challenge Cup at Henley Royal Regatta six times.

In 2018 the SPSBC 1st VIII were named "the best schoolboy crew ever" at Henley Royal Regatta after a season of unprecedented success. The crew won the "triple crown" of schoolboy rowing with record breaking wins in the Princess Elizabeth Challenge Cup and the School's Head of the River, plus victory at the National School's Regatta in the Queen Mother's Challenge Cup; they also won the Men's Youth Eights at Head of the Charles in a record time and recorded the fastest time in history by any schoolboy crew over 2k of 5:36.59 at Marlow Regatta. Members of the crew also won the Pairs Head, Sculler's Head & Fours Head and all eligible members of the crew won gold medals at the World Rowing Junior Championships that year.

Examinations
In 2008, for the first time, its students sat the IGCSE exam instead of the GCSE in Science, following sitting IGCSE in Mathematics the previous year. The school does not currently offer the International Baccalaureate as an alternative to A Level, and has suffered on many league tables as a result. Dr Martin Stephen, former High Master of St Paul's, has stated he believes that "league tables put massive pressure on headmasters to do bad things" and announced that St Paul's will be joining other private schools in London in withdrawing from the ISC's 2008 league tables.

The school record for students gaining places at Oxford or Cambridge was 74 pupils in 2010, representing 42% of the year group. In the same year, a record 53.5% of A Level entries were graded at A*, with 93.5% of grades at A* or A and 99.4% at or above a B. According to more recent data, pupils starting university in 2016 numbered 189. Of those starting in the UK in 2016, 95% went on to Russell Group universities, with 53 entering Oxford or Cambridge. The highest ever number of pupils (34) chose to study in America, at Ivy League or equivalent schools. In 2017, 72 pupils were made offers by Oxford or Cambridge, with 40 offers for Oxford and 32 for Cambridge. In addition, 40 pupils received offers from North American universities, with no fewer than five securing places at Yale. A further three offers were made each by Princeton and Columbia.

The school had its first student attain a place on the Prime Minister's Global Fellowship programme in 2009.

The school also has its first student win the national competition of IFS Young Business Writer of the Year 2010 Award, an award for the top young business thinker.

GCSE summary: last six years

A level summary: last six years

High Masters

The head teacher of St Paul's is known as the High Master, and the deputy head as the Surmaster. These titles are assigned in the school statutes. The following have been High Masters of St Paul's:

Other notable staff
Josh Hawley (born 1979), U.S. senator
George Green Loane (1865–1945), housemaster, classical scholar
Francis Sowerby Macaulay (1862–1937), mathematician

Associated schools
By the end of the 19th century, the funds of the Dean Colet Foundation had increased to such an extent that the Trustees decided to build a school for girls, and in 1904, St Paul's Girls' School was opened in Brook Green, Hammersmith, just around the corner from the then site of the boys' school in Hammersmith Road. Unlike the boys', the girls' school remains in its original position, although it has expanded and constructed new buildings and facilities alongside the old. In 1881, a boys' preparatory school was founded which in 1892 became Colet Court, and in 2016 St Paul's Juniors. St Paul's Juniors is now on the same site as the main school and most of its pupils are expected to pass into St Paul's School when they reach the age of 13. It thus serves as a junior school for the main establishment.

Former pupils

Former pupils are known as Old Paulines, and may keep in touch with each other through the Old Pauline Club. Various sporting clubs are affiliated to the Old Pauline Club, such as the Old Pauline Football Club (OPFC), which is the oldest Old Boys' rugby club in the world, the Old Pauline Association Football Club (OPAFC), the Old Pauline Cricket Club (OPCC), Colet Boat Club, which regularly races in national events, the Old Pauline Association Club (OPAC) and the Old Pauline Harvey Chess Society (OPHCS), who have participated in many national tournaments with moderate success. The club is located on a  site in Thames Ditton and owns a number of sports pitches there, as well as the Colets' Health and Fitness Club. There is also a Masonic lodge, Old Pauline Lodge No 3969, which celebrated its centenary in 2019. The Lodge meets at the School.

See also
 St Paul's Girls' School

References

Bibliography

External links

 
 Old Pauline Club
 Old Pauline Association Football Club
 Old Pauline Cricket Club
 Old Pauline Football Club

1509 establishments in England
Alfred Waterhouse buildings
Barnes, London
Boarding schools in London
Educational institutions established in the 1500s
Private boys' schools in London
Private schools in the London Borough of Richmond upon Thames
Member schools of the Headmasters' and Headmistresses' Conference
 
Racquets venues
History of the London Borough of Hammersmith and Fulham